This is a list of the most topographically isolated mountains of Switzerland. This list only includes summits with an isolation of at least , regardless of their elevation or topographical prominence (drop). For a general list of mountains, with height and prominence ranking, see List of mountains of Switzerland.

The list includes all eight ultra-prominent peaks of Switzerland as well as several canton high points.

List

References

External links
Directory of the mountains of Switzerland, including topographic isolation and prominence

 
Switzerland